"Missile" is a song by French singer Lartiste, released on April 1, 2016 as him studio album Missile

In December 2022, the track experienced a resurgence in popularity after a sped-up version went viral on TikTok

Writing and composition
"Missile" is a pop-rap song written in the key of Cm major with a moderate tempo of 115 beats per minute. "Missile" tells of the artist fell in declaration of love.

Music video
As of December 2022, the music video for Missile had over 36 million views on YouTube.

Charts

References

2016 songs
2016 singles
Pop-rap songs
Polydor Records singles
French-language songs